The Cobalt station is a former train station located in the town of Cobalt in Ontario, and was a stop for Ontario Northland's Northlander trains.

The station itself is occupied by the offices of the Historic Cobalt Corporation and the Bunker Military Museum; passengers had to wait outside to flag down the train and purchase tickets once aboard.

Architecture

The station was designed by the prominent Canadian architect John M. Lyle and constructed in 1910 for the Timiskaming and Northern Ontario Railway. It is a long and low -storey brick structure, with an overhanging hipped roof which is gently curved. The roof contains pedimented dormers, with a central block Flemish gable that breaks the roofline and emphasizes the main entrance.

The dormers were to allow natural light to penetrate the waiting rooms. Waiting rooms were designed with exposed red brick walls, with several courses of dark brick to unify the large interior spaces horizontally. The interior features a wooden ceiling with massive timber roof trusses.

The Town of Cobalt designated the station under the Ontario Heritage Act in 1979 and the Ontario Heritage Trust secured a heritage easement on the building in 1993.

Passenger train service to this station ceased in September 2012, and was replaced by bus service between Cochrane and Toronto.

References

External links
ONR - Cobalt Station
Ontario Heritage Trust page on Cobalt Station

Ontario Northland Railway stations
Transport in Cobalt, Ontario
Railway stations in Timiskaming District
Railway stations in Canada opened in 1910
Railway stations closed in 2012
Disused railway stations in Canada
Ontario Heritage Trust